Rudolf II (18 July 1552 – 20 January 1612) was Holy Roman Emperor (1576–1612), King of Hungary and Croatia (as Rudolf I, 1572–1608), King of Bohemia (1575–1608/1611) and Archduke of Austria (1576–1608). He was a member of the House of Habsburg.

Rudolf's legacy has traditionally been viewed in three ways: an ineffectual ruler whose mistakes led directly to the Thirty Years' War; a great and influential patron of Northern Mannerist art; and an intellectual devotee of occult arts and learning which helped seed what would be called the Scientific Revolution. Determined to unify Christendom, he initiated the Long Turkish War (1593–1606) with the Ottoman Empire. Exhausted by war, his citizens in Hungary revolted in the Bocskai Uprising, which led to more authority given to his brother Matthias. Under his reign, there was a policy of toleration towards Judaism.

Early life 

Rudolf was born in Vienna on 18 July 1552. He was the eldest son and successor of Maximilian II, Holy Roman Emperor, King of Bohemia, and King of Hungary and Croatia; his mother was the Spanish princess Maria, a daughter of Charles V and Isabella of Portugal. He was the elder brother of Matthias who was to succeed him as King of Bohemia and Holy Roman Emperor.
Rudolf spent eight formative years, from age 11 to 19 (1563–1571), in Spain, at the court of his maternal uncle Philip II, together with his younger brother Ernest, future governor of the Low Countries. 

After his return to Vienna, his father was concerned about Rudolf's aloof and stiff manner, typical of the more conservative Spanish court, rather than the more relaxed and open Austrian court; but his Spanish mother saw in him courtliness and refinement. In the years following his return to Vienna, Rudolf was crowned King of Hungary (1572), King of Bohemia and King of the Romans (1575) when his father was still alive.

For the rest of his life, Rudolf would remain reserved, secretive, and largely a recluse who did not like to travel or even partake in the daily affairs of state. 

He was more intrigued by occult learning such as astrology and alchemy, which was mainstream in the Renaissance period, and had a wide variety of personal hobbies such as horses, clocks, collecting rarities, and being a patron of the arts. He suffered from periodic bouts of "melancholy" (depression), which was common in the Habsburg line. These became worse with age, and were manifested by a withdrawal from the world and its affairs into his private interests.

Personal life

Like Elizabeth I of England (who was born 19 years before he was), Rudolf dangled himself as a prize in a string of diplomatic negotiations for marriages, but never in fact married. During his periods of self-imposed isolation, Rudolf reportedly had affairs with his court chamberlain, Wolfgang von Rumpf, and a series of valets. One of these, Philip Lang, ruled him  for years and was hated by those seeking favour with the emperor.

In addition, Rudolf was known to have had a succession of affairs with women, some of whom claimed to have been impregnated by him. He had several illegitimate children by his mistress Catherina Strada. Their eldest son, Don Julius Caesar d'Austria, was likely born between 1584 and 1586 and received an education and opportunities for political and social prominence from his father. Another famous child was Caroline (1591-1662), Princess of Cantecroix, mother-in-law of Beatrice de Cusance, later Duchess of Lorraine (as second wife of Charles IV of Lorraine). 

Rudolf succeeded his father Maximilian II on 12 October 1576. In 1583, he moved the court to Prague.  

In 1607, Rudolf sent Julius to live at Český Krumlov in Bohemia (in what is now the Czech Republic), a castle which Rudolf purchased from Peter Vok/Wok von Rosenberg, the last of the House of Rosenberg, after he fell into financial ruin.  Julius lived at Český Krumlov when in 1608 he reportedly abused and murdered the daughter of a local barber, who had been living in the castle, and then disfigured her body. Rudolf condemned his son's act and suggested that he should be imprisoned for the rest of his life.
 
However, Julius died in 1609 after showing signs of schizophrenia, refusing to bathe, and living in squalor; his death was apparently caused by an ulcer that ruptured.

Many artworks commissioned by Rudolf are unusually erotic. The emperor was the subject of a whispering campaign by his enemies in his family and the Catholic Church in the years before he was deposed. Sexual allegations may well have formed a part of the campaign against him.

Reign

Historians have traditionally blamed Rudolf's preoccupation with the arts, occult sciences, and other personal interests as the reason for the political disasters of his reign. More recently historians have re-evaluated this view and see his patronage of the arts and occult sciences as a triumph and key part of the Renaissance, while his political failures are seen as a legitimate attempt to create a unified Christian empire, which was undermined by the realities of religious, political and intellectual disintegrations of the time.

Although raised in his uncle's Catholic court in Spain, Rudolf was tolerant of Protestantism and other religions including Judaism. This tolerant policy by the Empire towards the Jews would see Jewish cultural life flourishing and its population increased under Rudolf's reign.He largely withdrew from Catholic observances, even in death refusing the last sacramental rites. He had little attachment to Protestants either, except as counter-weight to papal policies. He put his primary support behind conciliarists, irenicists and humanists. When the papacy instigated the Counter-Reformation, using agents sent to his court, Rudolf backed those whom he thought were the most neutral in the debate, not taking a side or trying to effect restraint, thus leading to political chaos and threatening to provoke civil war.

His conflict with the Ottoman Empire was the final cause of his undoing. Unwilling to compromise with the Turks, and stubbornly determined that he could unify all of Christendom with a new Crusade, he started a long and indecisive war with the Turks in 1593. This war lasted till 1606, and was known as the "Long Turkish War". 

By 1604, his Hungarian subjects were exhausted by the war and revolted, led by Stephen Bocskai (Bocskai uprising). In 1605, Rudolf was forced by his other family members to cede control of Hungarian affairs to his younger brother Archduke Matthias. By 1606, Matthias had forged a difficult peace with the Hungarian rebels (Peace of Vienna) and the Turks (Peace of Zsitvatorok). 

Rudolf was angry with his brother's concessions, which he saw as giving away too much in order to further Matthias' hold on power. So Rudolf prepared to start a new war with the Turks. But Matthias rallied support from the disaffected Hungarians and forced Rudolf to cede the crowns of Hungary, Austria, and Moravia to him. At the same time, Bohemian Protestants demanded greater religious liberty, which Rudolf granted in the Letter of Majesty in 1609. Bohemians continued to press for further freedoms, and Rudolf used his army to repress them.

Bohemian Protestants then appealed to Matthias for help; Matthias' army held Rudolf prisoner in his castle in Prague until 1611, when Rudolf ceded the crown of Bohemia, as well, to his brother.

Death

Rudolf died in 1612, nine months after he had been stripped of all effective power by his younger brother, except the empty title of Holy Roman Emperor, to which Matthias was elected five months later. In May 1618 with the event known as the Defenestration of Prague, the Protestant Bohemians, in defence of the rights granted them in the Letter of Majesty, threw imperial officials out of the window and thus the Thirty Years' War (1618–1648) started.

Art collecting and patronage

Rudolf moved the Habsburg capital from Vienna to Prague in 1583. Rudolf loved collecting paintings, and was often reported to sit and stare in rapture at a new work for hours on end. He spared no expense in acquiring great past masterworks, such as those of Dürer and Brueghel. He was also patron to some of the best contemporary artists, who mainly produced new works in the Northern Mannerist style, such as Bartholomeus Spranger, Hans von Aachen, Giambologna, Giuseppe Arcimboldo, Aegidius Sadeler, Roelant Savery, Joris Hoefnagel and Adrian de Vries, as well as commissioning works from Italians like Veronese. 

Rudolf's collections were the most impressive in the Europe of his day, and the greatest collection of Northern Mannerist art ever assembled. The adjective Rudolfine, as in "Rudolfine Mannerism" is often used in art history to describe the style of the art he patronized.

His love of collecting went far beyond paintings and sculptures. He commissioned decorative objects of all kinds and in particular mechanical moving devices. Ceremonial swords and musical instruments, clocks, water works, astrolabes, compasses, telescopes and other scientific instruments, were all produced for him by some of the best craftsmen in Europe.

He patronized natural philosophers such as the botanist Charles de l'Ecluse, and the astronomers Tycho Brahe and Johannes Kepler both attended his court. Tycho Brahe developed the Rudolphine Tables (finished by Kepler, after Brahe's death), the first comprehensive table of data of the movements of the planets. As mentioned before, Rudolf also attracted some of the best scientific instrument makers of the time, such as Jost Bürgi, Erasmus Habermel and Hans Christoph Schissler. They had direct contact with the court astronomers and, through the financial support of the court, they were economically independent to develop scientific instruments and manufacturing techniques.

The poet Elizabeth Jane Weston, a writer of Renaissance Latin poetry, was also part of his court and wrote numerous odes to him.

Rudolf kept a menagerie of exotic animals, botanical gardens, and Europe's most extensive "cabinet of curiosities" (Kunstkammer) incorporating "the three kingdoms of nature and the works of man". It was housed at Prague Castle, where between 1587 and 1605 he built the northern wing to house his growing collections. A lion and a tiger were allowed to roam the castle, documented by the account books which record compensation paid to survivors of attacks, or to family members of victims.

Rudolf was even alleged by one person to have owned the Voynich manuscript, a codex whose author and purpose, as well as the language and script and posited cipher remain unidentified to this day. According to hearsay passed on in a letter written by Johannes Marcus Marci in 1665, Rudolf was said to have acquired the manuscript at some unspecified time for 600 gold ducats. No evidence in support of this single piece of hearsay has ever been discovered. The Codex Gigas was also in his possessions.

As was typical of the time, Rudolf II had a portrait painted in the studio of the renowned Alonso Sánchez Coello. Completed in 1567, the portrait depicted Rudolf II at the age of 15. This painting can be seen at the Lobkowicz Palace in the Rozmberk room.

By 1597, the collection occupied three rooms of the incomplete northern wing. When building was completed in 1605, the collection was moved to the dedicated Kunstkammer. Naturalia (minerals and gemstones) were arranged in a 37 cabinet display that had three vaulted chambers in front, each about 5.5 metres wide by 3 metres high and 60 metres long, connected to a main chamber 33 metres long. Large uncut gemstones were held in strong boxes.

Rudolf's Kunstkammer was not a typical "cabinet of curiosities" – a haphazard collection of unrelated specimens. Rather, the Rudolfine Kunstkammer was systematically arranged in an encyclopaedic fashion. In addition, Rudolf II employed his polyglot court physician, Anselmus Boetius de Boodt, to curate the collection. Anselmus was an avid mineral collector and travelled widely on collecting trips to the mining regions of Germany, Bohemia and Silesia, often accompanied by his Bohemian naturalist friend, Thaddaeus Hagecius. Between 1607 and 1611, Anselmus catalogued the Kunstkammer, and in 1609 he published Gemmarum et Lapidum, one of the finest mineralogical treatises of the 17th century.

As was customary at the time, the collection was private, but friends of the Emperor, artists, and professional scholars were allowed to study it. The collection became an invaluable research tool during the flowering of 17th-century European philosophy, the "Age of Reason".

Rudolf's successors did not appreciate the collection and the Kunstkammer gradually fell into disarray. Some 50 years after its establishment, most of the collection was packed into wooden crates and moved to Vienna. The collection remaining at Prague was looted during the last year of the Thirty Years War, by Swedish troops who sacked Prague Castle on 26 July 1648, also taking the best of the paintings, many of which later passed to the Orléans Collection after the death of Christina of Sweden. In 1782, the remainder of the collection was sold piecemeal to private parties by Joseph II. One of the surviving items from the Kunstkammer  is a "fine chair" looted by the Swedes in 1648 and now owned by the Earl of Radnor at Longford Castle in England; others survive in museums.

Occult sciences

Astrology and alchemy were regarded as mainstream scientific fields in Renaissance Prague, and Rudolf was a firm devotee of both. His lifelong quest was to find the philosopher's stone and Rudolf spared no expense in bringing Europe's best alchemists to court, such as Edward Kelley and John Dee. Rudolf even performed his own experiments in a private alchemy laboratory. When Rudolf was a prince, Nostradamus prepared a horoscope which was dedicated to him as 'Prince and King'. In the 1590s, Michael Sendivogius was active at Rudolph's court.

Rudolf gave Prague a mystical reputation that persists in part to this day, with Alchemists' Alley on the grounds of Prague Castle a popular visiting place and tourist attraction.

Rudolf was a patron of the occult sciences, along with this and his practice of tolerance towards Jews; it was during his reign that the legend of the Golem of Prague was established.

Ancestors

See also

 History of Austria
 Kings of Germany family tree; he was related to every other king of Germany
 Moldavian Magnate Wars for the background on southern wars (with Ottoman Turkey and its allies)
 Vespasiano I Gonzaga, a friend of Rudolf who built a Renaissance "Ideal city" in Sabbioneta, Italy
 Mineral collecting – Rudolf II was the 16th century's most famous mineral collector; his collections were curated by Anselmus Boetius de Boodt

References

Sources
Bolton, Henry Carrington (1904). The Follies of Science at the Court of Rudolph II, 1576–1612, Milwaukee: Pharmaceutical Review Publishing Co., 1904. From Internet Archive Inaccurate and misleading
Evans, R. J. W. (1973). Rudolf II and his world: A study in intellectual history, 1576–1612. Oxford: Clarendon Press, 2nd ed, 1984. Considered the fundamental re-evaluation of Rudolf.
Rowse, A. L. (1977). Homosexuals in History: Ambivalence in Society, Literature and the Arts. MacMillan Publishing Co., Inc. 
 Howard Hotson. "Rudolf II", in Encyclopedia of the Renaissance, ed. Paul Grendler. Vol. 5. 
Marshall, Peter (2006). The Magic Circle of Rudolf II: Alchemy and Astrology in Renaissance Prague. . Also published as The Theatre of the World: Alchemy, Astrology and Magic in Renaissance Prague (in the UK, ; in Canada); and in paperback as The Mercurial Emperor: The Magic Circle of Rudolf II in Renaissance Prague (2007) . Biography, focusing on the many artists and scientists Rudolf patronized.
Trevor-Roper, Hugh; Princes and Artists, Patronage and Ideology at Four Habsburg Courts 1517–1633, Thames & Hudson, London, 1976,

External links

 Rudolf II, from Encyclopædia Britannica, latest edition online, full-article.
 Rudolf II and Prague, 1997 official exhibition.
 Prague during the reign of Rudolf II, by Jacob Wisse, in Timeline of Art History. New York: The Metropolitan Museum of Art, 2000.
 Rudolf II, by Edward Einhorn, tells the story of the latter part of Rudolf II's life.
 
 
 
 
 Rudolf II, BBC Radio 4 discussion with Peter Forshaw, Howard Hotson & Adam Mosley (In Our Time, Jan. 31, 2008)

Regnal titles

 
1552 births
1612 deaths
16th-century Holy Roman Emperors
17th-century Holy Roman Emperors
16th-century archdukes of Austria
17th-century archdukes of Austria
Monarchs of Transylvania
Burials at St. Vitus Cathedral
Knights of the Garter
Knights of the Golden Fleece
Austrian occultists
Nobility from Vienna
1590s in Romania
1600s in Romania
16th-century occultists
17th-century occultists
Dukes of Carniola
Sons of emperors
Children of Maximilian II, Holy Roman Emperor